Dr Satyanarayan Jatiya (born 4 February 1946) is an Indian politician. He was elected to the Lok Sabha seven times from Ujjain as a member of Bharatiya Janata Party, and served one term (2014–2020) in Rajya Sabha. He was cabinet minister in Vajpayee's government from 1999 to 2004 and held portfolios of labour and social justice and empowerment. Currently, he is member of BJP Parliamentary Board.

Early life
Born in Jawad of Neemuch district in Madhya Pradesh in 1946 he studied B.Sc., MA., LL.B., Ph.D at Vikram University, Ujjain. He entered politics in 1972  and was detained under MISA during emergency. He was elected to Madhya Pradesh Legislative Assembly in 1977. He was later elected to 7th (1980), 9th (1989), 10th, 11th, 12th, 13th and 14th (2004–2009) Lok Sabha from Ujjain.

He is also a poet and a collection of his poems, Alakh, was published in 1995.

References

External links 
 Members of Thirteenth Lok Sabha - Parliament of India website
 Members of Fourteenth Lok Sabha - Parliament of India website

Indian male poets
Janata Party politicians
Bharatiya Janata Party politicians from Madhya Pradesh
Poets from Madhya Pradesh
India MPs 2004–2009
People from Mandsaur
India MPs 1980–1984
India MPs 1989–1991
India MPs 1991–1996
India MPs 1996–1997
India MPs 1998–1999
India MPs 1999–2004
People from Ujjain
Madhya Pradesh MLAs 1977–1980
Lok Sabha members from Madhya Pradesh
Indians imprisoned during the Emergency (India)
Politicians from Ujjain
Labour ministers of India
Vikram University alumni
Living people
1946 births
Rajya Sabha members from Madhya Pradesh
Rajya Sabha members from the Bharatiya Janata Party